The AMT Theater, formerly the Davenport Theatre is an Off-Broadway theater venue located at 354 West 45th Street between Eighth and Ninth Avenues in the Hell's Kitchen neighborhood of Manhattan, New York City. It was operated by Off-Broadway producer Ken Davenport in a building owned by Gran Logia de Lengua Española Vales De Nueva York.

Previously called the 45th Street Theatre, the Davenport Theatre was leased by producer Ken Davenport in 2014 and renamed after his great-grandfather, Delbert Essex Davenport, a producer, publicist, and author in the early 1900s.

The Davenport Theatre had two performances spaces, a 149-seat main stage on the ground floor and a 99-seat black box recently renovated and renamed, The Loft at the Davenport Theatre on the third floor.

In 2019, the theater was converted to NYC Tango, a dance hall.

Following the COVID-19 pandemic shutdown, the building reopened in 2022 as AMT Theater with An Unbalanced Mind.

Theatre history
1984–2004 – Primary Stages
2007–2012 – 45th Street Theatre (some overlap with Primary Stages)
2013 – New Theatre at 45th Street
2014– 2018 – Davenport Theatre
2019 – New York City Tango

Building history
The five-story building was built in 1915 as an electric substation by the United Electric Light & Power Company which promoted alternating current in the war of the currents while New York Edison was promoting direct current.  Although the direct current standard lost to ac in the war Edison had continued to electrify lower Manhattan with direct current and accounted for 90 percent of the electric power at the time against United's 10 percent.  The  substation in particular was aimed at providing reliable power to Broadway theatres and Times Square signs at a time when most theatres had direct current.  In 1928 New York Edison began the process to adopt the AC standard and by 1935 had totally acquired United.

After the building was decommissioned as a substation it became a Masonic Lodge.  The masonic emblem with the inscription "Gran Logia de Lengua Española Vales De Nueva York" still hangs over the entrance and the abbreviation ALGDGADU is also above the entrance. The abbreviation is interpreted from Spanish "A La Gloria Del Gran Arquitecto Del Universo" to say "to the Glory of the Great Architect of the Universe."

According to the building's certificate of occupancy from 1959, the space was intended to be used as offices and a recording studio  and had been used illegally as a theater space for several decades.

As of September 2019, the theater portion of the building was converted to the New York City Tango dance hall.

Productions
Selected productions at the Davenport Theatre.

References

External links 
 

Off-Broadway theaters
Theatres in Manhattan
Hell's Kitchen, Manhattan